The 2014 Coca-Cola GM was the 44th edition of the Greenlandic Men's Football Championship. The final round was held in Nuuk from August 4 to 9. It was won by B-67 Nuuk for the third consecutive time and for the tenth time in its history.

Qualifying stage

North Greenland
All matches were played in Uummannaq.

NB Some match results are unavailable.

Disko Bay
All matches were played in Qeqertarsuaq.

Central Greenland
All matches were played in Maniitsoq.

NB Nuuk IL qualified for the final Round as hosts.

East Greenland

NB TM-62 withdrew for financial reasons and were replaced by Nagtoralik Paamiut (South Greenland runners-up).

South Greenland
All matches were played in Qaqortoq.

Final round

Pool 1

Pool 2

Playoffs

Semi-finals

Seventh-place match

Fifth-place match

Third-place match

Final

See also
Football in Greenland
Football Association of Greenland
Greenland national football team
Greenlandic Men's Football Championship

References

Greenlandic Men's Football Championship seasons
Green
Green
football
Greenlandic Football Championship